Valérie Petit (born 23 June 1976) is a French politician who has been serving as a member of the French National Assembly since the 2017 elections, representing the 9th constituency of the department of Nord. From 2016 until 2020, she was a member of La République En Marche! (LREM).

In parliament, Petit serves on the Finance Committee. In early 2020, Petit left LREM. She sits with the Agir ensemble group in the Parliament.

See also
 2017 French legislative election

References

1976 births
Living people
Deputies of the 15th National Assembly of the French Fifth Republic
Place of birth missing (living people)
La République En Marche! politicians
Women members of the National Assembly (France)
Agir (France) politicians
21st-century French women politicians